Drillia levanderi is a species of sea snail, a marine gastropod mollusk in the family Drilliidae.

Description
The length of the shell attains 19.5 mm, its diameter 7.2 mm.

Distribution
This marine species occurs off Eritrea.
.

References

 Sturany Rudolf (1905), Beiträge zur Kenntnis der Molluskenfauna des Roten Meeres und des Golfes yon Aden; Nachrichtsblatt der Deutschen Malakozoologischen Gesellschaft vol. 37 p. 136

External links
 

Endemic fauna of Eritrea
levanderi
Gastropods described in 1905